Captain Edmund Geoffrey Abbott, GC (20 July 1895 – 3 April 1974) was a Royal Navy officer and recipient of the Albert Medal, later exchanged for the George Cross.

Abbott was promoted to captain on 5 July 1939.

Albert Medal
On 12 March 1920, Abbott was gazetted for his actions on 5 August 1919. His citation read:

As the Albert Medal was replaced by the George Cross in 1971, Abbott's post-nominal letters changed from AM to GC at that time.

References

Further reading

External links
 Royal Navy (RN) Officers 1939–1945

1895 births
1974 deaths
People from Northwood, London
Recipients of the Albert Medal (lifesaving)
Royal Navy officers of World War I
Royal Navy officers of World War II